Diaconu is a Romanian surname. It may refer to:

Adrian Diaconu (born 1978), Romanian professional boxer
Andreea Diaconu (born 1991), Romanian model
Eusebiu Diaconu (born 1981), Romanian Greco-Roman wrestler
Mircea Diaconu (born 1949), Romanian actor
Nicolae Diaconu (born 1980), Romanian water polo player
Raul Diaconu (born 1989), Romanian footballer
Ivan Diaconu (fl. 2000), Moldovan wrestler

Romanian-language surnames